The Karapur Miah Bari Mosque is a three domed ancient mosque and archaeological site located in the Barisal District of Bangladesh. It is located in Miah Bari, in the village of North Karapur in Raipasha-Karapur Union, Barisal Sadar Upazila.

History
According to local tradition, this Mughal architecture style mosque was built by Hayat Mahmud, the zamindar of Buzurg-Umedpur Pargana, in the 18th century. Mahmud was rebellious to the British government and exiled to Penang Island (formerly Prince of Wales island) in Malaysia. His family was stripped of Umedpur's zamindarship. It was after Hayat's return to Bengal, sixteen years later, in which he built the Miah Bari Mosque taking inspiration from the Kartalab Khan Mosque in Old Dhaka. However, some believe the mosque was built by his son, Mahmud Zahid. The mosque is now under the protection of Department of Archaeology.

Architecture
It is a two-storied, typical Bengali Mughal type style mosque with 6 doors on the ground floor and 3 on the top floor. The space under the platform is currently used for madrasa. A 3.02m wide flight stairs lead to the platform where the rectangle shaped prayer hall is placed on the western side, it measures 13.49m by 6.1m while internally it has an oblong plan of 11.2m x 3.9m with a 1.05m thick surrounding plastered brick wall. The whole length of the rectangular hall is divided into three unequal bays using two arches emerging from the east and west walls.  The square central bay is transformed into an octagonal area by using brick pendentives. three small sized, fluted, bulbous domes are placed on the octagonal corners, here the central dome is larger than the other 2. The domes have an octagonal shoulder and are crowned with elongated finials.

The eastern facade of the prayer hall has 3 openings, each of the openings are bounded by a slender engaged turret and the openings have a cusped arch on the outside surface. The mosque has three domes and eight big minarets, four on the front wall and four on the back wall. In addition, there are 12 smaller minarets in the space between the front and back walls. The upper part of the North, South  & West walls’ outer wall surfaces is profusely ornamented in plaster. 

The floral relief has white surface coating and the recessed surface is painted in blue. The four corner turrets, one at each corner and two additional turrets on the front and back facades are octagonal in shape which extend high above the roof level with their plastered blind kiosk divided by three eaves and ended in a small cupola having an amla kalasha typed finial.

See also
 List of archaeological sites in Bangladesh

References

Mosques in Bangladesh
18th-century establishments in British India
Archaeological sites in Barisal district
Architecture in Bangladesh